Anne is a village in Antsla Parish, Võru County, in southeastern Estonia. As of 2011, it had a population of 26.

Anne has a station on the currently inactive Valga–Pechory railway.

References

Villages in Võru County